is a train station in Iwamizawa, Hokkaidō, Japan.

Lines
Shibun Station is served by the Muroran Main Line.

Station layout

The station has two ground-level opposed side platforms serving two track. Kitaca is not available. The station is unattended.

Platforms

Adjacent stations

References

Railway stations in Hokkaido Prefecture
Railway stations in Japan opened in 1902